Tohoa Tauroa "Paul" Koteka (born 30 September 1956) is a former New Zealand rugby union player. A prop, Koteka represented Waikato at a provincial level, and was a member of the New Zealand national side, the All Blacks, in 1981 and 1982. He played six matches for the All Blacks including two internationals. After moving to Perth, he represented Western Australia, and became captain of the team.

References

1956 births
Living people
Rugby union players from Tokoroa
New Zealand rugby union players
New Zealand international rugby union players
Waikato rugby union players
Rugby union props
Māori All Blacks players
New Zealand emigrants to Australia
People educated at Tokoroa High School